Sydney Leslie Turner (born August 17, 2005) is a Canadian artistic gymnast. A senior gymnast since 2021, she competed at the 2022 World Artistic Gymnastics Championships where she was a member of the historic bronze medal-winning Canadian team.

References

External links 
 

2005 births
Living people
Canadian female artistic gymnasts
Sportspeople from British Columbia
Medalists at the World Artistic Gymnastics Championships
21st-century Canadian women